Chachkam (also Romanized as Chāchkām and Chāch Kām; also known as Chāch) is a village in Tangeh Soleyman Rural District, Kolijan Rostaq District, Sari County, Mazandaran Province, Iran. At the 2006 census, its population was 130, in 37 families.

References 

Populated places in Sari County